The Bani Hamida are a nomadic Bedouin tribe living in Jordan.

History

19th century
In 1869, members of the Bani Hamida shattered the recently discovered Moabite Stone into pieces by lighting a fire under it and then pouring cold water over it. The stele was discovered by Henry Baker Tristram on his trip with Sheikh Sattam Al-Fayez when they visited the Bani Hamida's territory. When Emir Fendi Al-Fayez sent his cousin's son Eid to negotiate the sale of the stone, members of the Bani Hamida decided to destroy the stone as an act of defiance of the Ottomans. In the aftermath, several Bani Hamida were killed. Though many of the fragments were later retrieved, the full text, one of the earliest Hebrew-related scripts, was only preserved through a hurried copy made under difficult conditions.

The Bani Hamida also had a reputation for breeding "the best blood horses in Moab", according to explorer Charles M. Doughty, 1876.

In 1891, there was fighting between the Beni Sakher tribe and the Bani Hamida.

F.J. Bliss, who visited in March 1895, writes that "the sheikhs of the Hamideh were very civil and anxious to show us all the torn stones which is their phrase covering inscriptions and ornamentation." He was travelling with permission from the Ottoman authorities, who in December 1893 had installed a governor in Karak who improved security for travellers.

John Edward Gray Hill and his wife, also travelling in 1895 on their fourth attempt to visit Petra, met the Hameideh south of Madeba. Five years earlier, the tribe had "harassed" Hill and tried to stop them. Their previous guide Abu Seyne was unable to guide them due to a blood feud. Hill describes travelling in beautiful spring weather through country green with young corn. At Wadi Waleh they found a "sweet little stream amongst the oleanders" from which their cook caught fish by throwing something into the water which "made them insensible for a brief period". One day's travel from Madeba brought them to Dhiban where there was a military camp. Here the Sheikh of the Hameideh, "who had troubled us in 1890", offered to show an inscription "up a winding valley". After walking "a long way in the hot sun" Hill was shown a flat stone "on which three or four Greek (?) letters appeared". The following night, while camped halfway on their journey to Kerak, their tents were fired on by members of the Mujelli tribe. About twenty shots were fired, but no-one was hurt. Hill speculates that the attack was to deter them from making claims against the Mujelli for compensation for "their robbery and detention of us in 1890".

20th century
In 1985, 12 women of the tribe launched a weaving project, which produces woven items in traditionally bright colors. Traditional ground looms, assembled using stones and sticks, are used for the weaving, and the products can be found at numerous outlets in Jordan and abroad. Visitors can stop by the weaving rooms, located in the village of Mukawir, to see how the rugs are made. The women also make decorative candles.

References

Tribes of Arabia
Tribes of Jordan
Bedouin groups
Moab